Nizhny Dzhengutay (Töben Jüñütey) is a rural locality (a selo) in Buynaksky District, Republic of Dagestan, Russia. The population was 7,519 as of 2010. There are 35 streets.

Geography 
Nizhny Dzhengutay is located 20 km southeast of Buynaksk (the district's administrative centre) by road, on the Paraul-ozen River. Verkhy Dzhengutay and Dorgeli are the nearest rural localities.

References 

Rural localities in Buynaksky District